Forster v Wilson (1843) 152 ER 1165 is a UK insolvency law and English property law case, concerning the right to set off a debt against an insolvent company. It establishes that a person with a right to set off is not subject to the pooling of assets in insolvent liquidation.

Facts
Mr Wilson (among others) was in debt to a group of bankers that had gone bankrupt (the company was Batson & Co). Mr Forster had been assigned by this group the right to sue to get the debt back. Mr Wilson had been given £5 notes, issued by the bank, by some of his customers in his own business. Mr Wilson had also received other £5 notes, for which they were to pay so much only as they should receive from the assignees for such notes.

The question was whether Mr Wilson could set off the amounts in the £5 notes against the debts he owed to the bank.

Judgment
Parke B held that Mr Wilson (and the other defendants) had a beneficial interest in the first type of notes, and were therefore entitled to set them off. But he was not entitled to set off the last-mentioned class, as they held them merely as trustees for others.

See also
UK insolvency law

United Kingdom insolvency case law
Exchequer of Pleas cases
1843 in British law
1843 in case law